The 2008 Indian Premier League season was the inaugural season of the Indian Premier League, established by the BCCI in 2007. The season commenced on 18 April 2008 with the final match was held on 1 June 2008. The competition started with a double round robin league stage, in which each of the 8 teams played a home match and an away match against every other team. These matches were followed by two semi-finals and a final. The tagline was, Tu laga dum!(Put all your power!).

In a match which went down to the last ball, Rajasthan Royals defeated Chennai Super Kings in the final to win the title, with Yusuf Pathan named the player of the match in the Finals and Shane Watson adjudged the player of the tournament. Sohail Tanvir won the purple cap for being the top wicket-taking bowler while Shaun Marsh won the orange cap for leading run-scorer in the tournament. Shreevats Goswami was awarded the best under-19 player award and the special award for Fair Play was won by the CSK.

Auctions and personnel signings

The auctions for team ownership was held on January 24, 2008. Mumbai was the most expensive team, costing over 111.9 million. For the inaugural IPL season, each team had a salary cap of US$5 million (Rs. 20 crore approx.). Sachin Tendulkar, Sourav Ganguly, Rahul Dravid, Yuvraj Singh and Virender Sehwag were classified as icon players. They played for the franchises representing their home towns and hence did not enter the auction. Few players were classified as marquee players and the teams which lost out on icon players were allowed one extra marquee player to be selected in the auction. The first auction was conducted on 20 February 2008 with Mahendra Singh Dhoni winning the highest bid of US$1.5 million. Andrew Symonds was the most costly foreign player. A further second auction was held for few foreign players signed. Teams also signed players on individual basis.

Venues

Rules and regulations
Points in the group stage were awarded as follows:

In the event of tied scores after both teams have faced their quota of overs, a bowl-out will determine the winner, even in the group stage.

In the group stage, teams will be ranked on the following criteria:

 Higher number of points
 If equal, higher number of wins
 If still equal, net run rate
 If still equal, lower bowling strike rate
 If still equal, result of head-to-head meeting.

Teams and standings

Points table
(C) = Eventual champion; (R) = Runner-up.

Match summary

League stage

Matches 

 Mumbai Indians 5 run outs in their innings is a record in the IPL

Playoffs

Knockout stage

Semi-finals

Final

Statistics

Most runs

 The tournament's leading scorer wore an orange cap when fielding.

Full Table on Cricinfo

Most wickets

 The tournament's leading wicket taker wore a purple cap when fielding.
Full Table on cricinfo
Note: Economy rate acts as a tie-breaker if players are level for most wickets.

Controversies

Cheerleaders 

The IPL has been criticised by a few politicians and feminists for bringing in foreign cheerleaders, which is seen by many to not be in the traditional spirit of the game, as well as being against some Indian sensibilities. Two cheerleaders from London were asked to leave the ground at Mohali "because of the colour of their skin" by Wizcraft International Entertainment, which handles the team Kings XI Punjab. Ellesha Newton and Sherinne Anderson, both from London and of African ancestry were allegedly barred from entering the stadium by employees of Wizcraft International Entertainment on the pretext that "people don’t like dark girls here". Both the girls also allege that an employee referred to them with the racial slur ″nigger″.

Board of Control for Cricket in India (BCCI) said a probe would be initiated by the IPL only if the two women officially complain to IPL commissioner Lalit Modi.

BCCI and IPL officials are surprised that the two cheerleaders did not complain about the alleged racist behaviour while they were in India and spoke about it only after they returned to London.

"We have not received any complaint from any cheerleaders that they were asked to leave by the Mohali-based Kings XI Punjab franchise recently because of the colour of their skin," BCCI joint secretary M.P. Pandove said in Mohali.

Sreesanth – Harbhajan Singh altercation 
On 25 April 2008, following the Kings XI Punjab's victory over the Mumbai Indians at Mohali, Punjab player Sreesanth was slapped under his eye by Harbhajan Singh, the in-stand captain of Mumbai. The incident came to light as Sreesanth was caught by TV cameras sobbing inconsolably on the field before the presentation ceremony. Sreesanth had since downplayed the incident saying he had no complaints against Harbhajan who was "like an elder brother" to him. Harbhajan's team had lost their third consecutive match when he apparently reacted violently to Sreesanth's approaching him and reportedly saying "hard luck". The footage of the slap has not yet been released for public viewing. The BCCI launched an investigation into the incident and decided to ban Harbhajan for the remainder 11 matches of the Twenty20 tournament.

References

External links
 
 Cricinfo – Indian Premier League

 
Indian Premier League seasons
Indian Premier League